Stemshaug is a former municipality in Møre og Romsdal county, Norway.  The  municipality existed from 1914 until its dissolution in 1965.  The municipality included the eastern part of the island of Skardsøya and the mainland to the east and south of there surrounding the Dromnessundet and Torsetsundet straits and the Årvågsfjorden.  The Tjeldbergodden area on the mainland was also part of Stemshaug. The village of Stemshaug was the administrative centre of the municipality.

History
The municipality of Stemshaug was established on 1 July 1914 when Aure Municipality was divided.  The eastern district (population: 851) became the new Stemshaug Municipality and the western district (population: 2,372) continued on as Aure Municipality.  During the 1960s, there were many municipal mergers across Norway due to the work of the Schei Committee. On 1 January 1965, Stemshaug Municipality (population: 877) was merged with Aure Municipality (population: 2,203), and the parts of Valsøyfjord Municipality (population: 141) and Tustna Municipality (population: 85) located on the island of Ertvågøya.  The new municipality was also named Aure.

Government
All municipalities in Norway, including Stemshaug, are responsible for primary education (through 10th grade), outpatient health services, senior citizen services, unemployment and other social services, zoning, economic development, and municipal roads.  The municipality is governed by a municipal council of elected representatives, which in turn elects a mayor.

Municipal council
The municipal council  of Stemshaug was made up of 13 representatives that were elected to four year terms.  The party breakdown of the final municipal council was as follows:

See also
List of former municipalities of Norway

References

Aure, Norway
Former municipalities of Norway
1914 establishments in Norway
1965 disestablishments in Norway